The men's heavyweight event was part of the boxing programme at the 1952 Summer Olympics. The weight class allowed boxers of more than 81 kilograms to compete. The competition was held from 29 July to 2 August 1952. 21 boxers from 21 nations competed.

Medalists

Results

Johansson spent the entire bout backpedalling, without throwing a single punch. After receiving several warnings from the referee, he was finally disqualified for being excessively passive, and was not awarded the silver medal. He eventually received the medal in 1982.

1 Sosa did not enter the ring. 
2 Lansiaux retired from the competition due to injury.

References

Heavyweight